Xaphan is one of the fallen angels that rebelled with Satan against God, and is a demon of the 2nd rank.

During the rebellion against Heaven, he proposed to set fire to heaven before he and the other fallen were cast out. After being cast out of Heaven and into the Abyss, he has been fanning the flames of the furnaces of Hell with his mouth and hands. He has a bellows as an emblem.

References

 Dictionnaire Infernal - 

Xaphan